Wildenbach (also called Wildebach) is a river of North Rhine-Westphalia, Germany. It flows into the Heller in Neunkirchen.

See also
List of rivers of North Rhine-Westphalia

References

Rivers of North Rhine-Westphalia
Rivers of Siegerland
Rivers of Germany